Cecil Patrick Linton Lavery (6 October 1894 – 17 December 1967) was an Irish lawyer, judge and politician who served as a Judge of the Supreme Court from 1950 to 1966 and Attorney General of Ireland from 1948 to 1950. He served as a Teachta Dála (TD) for the Dublin County constituency from 1935 to 1938. He was also a Senator for the Cultural and Educational Panel from 1948 to 1950.

Early life
Born at English Street in Armagh, Lavery was the son of Patrick Lavery, a solicitor, and Annie Rose (née Vallely). He was educated at St Patrick's School, Armagh, Castleknock College, Dublin; and later at University College Dublin (UCD), where he became one of the first auditors of the UCD Law Society. In 1927, he was appointed to set up a "Memorial Committee" by W. T. Cosgrave, President of the Irish Free State Executive Council in order to advance the process of the Irish National War Memorial Gardens where an impasse situation had evolved.

Career
Lavery was elected to Dáil Éireann on his first attempt, at a by-election held on 17 June 1935 in the Dublin County constituency, after the death of Fine Gael TD Batt O'Connor. He was returned to the 9th Dáil at the 1937 general election, but the following year at the 1938 general election, he lost his seat to his Fine Gael running-mate Patrick Belton. Lavery had sympathetic views of fascism stating "Fascism has done much good in countries that have adopted it and may prove a satisfactory government for other countries in time to come.

He did not stand for election again until 1948, when he was elected to the 6th Seanad as a Senator for the Cultural and Educational Panel, and was appointed as Attorney General of Ireland by Taoiseach John A. Costello. Costello made two controversial decisions on Lavery's appointment; reversing the practice of many years he decided that Lavery could continue in private practice and that such fees as were paid to him as Attorney General should count as part of his income rather than be paid into the Exchequer. Costello justified both decisions on the ground that Lavery was one of the Bar's top earners and had taken a considerable pay cut as Attorney General. As Attorney General, he advised on several difficult issues, notably devaluation of the currency and fishing rights in Lough Foyle which were claimed by both Governments, North and South.

He left the Seanad on 21 April 1950, when he was appointed as a judge of the Supreme Court, where he served till his retirement in 1966. He was offered the presidency of the High Court but withdrew his name, apparently after the Department of Justice raised a question about his qualifications. In 1961, on the retirement of Conor Maguire, Costello lobbied hard for Lavery to be appointed Chief Justice of Ireland, calling him with perhaps some exaggeration "the outstanding Irish legal figure of the last half-century". He later lobbied, also unsuccessfully, for Lavery to be appointed a judge of the International Court of Justice (apparently the only time an Irish candidate was even considered).

References

1894 births
1967 deaths
Fine Gael TDs
Attorneys General of Ireland
Members of the 8th Dáil
Members of the 9th Dáil
Members of the 6th Seanad
Irish barristers
Judges of the Supreme Court of Ireland
Alumni of University College Dublin
People educated at Castleknock College
Fine Gael senators
People educated at St Patrick's Grammar School, Armagh